The 1968 Sun Bowl featured the Arizona Wildcats and the Auburn Tigers.

Background
The Wildcats had finished tied for 2nd in the Western Athletic Conference in their second year under Coach Mudra, improving from 3–6–1 the previous year to earn their first bowl appearance since 1949. The Tigers had finished tied for third in the Southeastern Conference in their first bowl game since 1965. This was the first Sun Bowl for either team. This was the first Sun Bowl broadcast by CBS. The partnership of CBS and the Sun Bowl is the longest continuous relationship between a bowl game and one TV network.

Game summary
A John Riley 52-yard field goal and a 65-yard touchdown pass from Loran Carter to Mickey Zofko gave the Tigers a 10-0 lead after one quarter. The Wildcats responded with a Steve Hurley 32 yard field goal and a Hal Arnason 12 yard touchdown catch from Bruce Lee (with 54 seconds remaining in the half) to make it tied at 10 after one half of play.  In the second half, Auburn took control in the span of 24 seconds. Tommy Taylor scored from 9 yards out to make it 17–10. On the ensuing possession for Arizona, Buddy McClinton intercepted a Lee pass and returned it 32 yards for a touchdown score to make it 24–10. When Auburn got the ball back, Carter threw a 42 yard touchdown pass to Tim Christian to make it 31–10. A Riley field goal made the final score 34–10. Auburn's Buddy McClinton caught three interceptions, had six tackles and scored a touchdown off an interception return en route to being named MVP, the first defensive back to be awarded the honor in the Sun Bowl. Lee set a record for most interceptions in the Sun Bowl with 6, on a miserable 6-of-24 for 89 yard performance. While Carter went 7-of-28 passing on three interceptions, he threw for 158 yards with two touchdowns.

Aftermath
The Wildcats did not return to the Sun Bowl again until 1985. The Tigers did not return again until 1973.

Statistics

References

Sun Bowl
Sun Bowl
Arizona Wildcats football bowl games
Auburn Tigers football bowl games
1968 in sports in Texas
December 1968 sports events in the United States